Liath Eilean (Scottish Gaelic: "Grey Island") is the name of several Scottish islands:

 Liath Eilean, MacCormaig Isles
 Liath Eilean, Loch Fyne
 Liath Eilean, Loch Caolisport